Lopes is a surname of Portuguese origin. It was originally a Patronymic, meaning Son of Lopo, itself being derived from Latin lupus, meaning wolf. Its Spanish equivalent is López, its Italian equivalent is Lupo, its French equivalent is Loup, and its Romanian equivalent is Lupu or Lupescu. Notable people with the surname include:

Maria do Couto Maia-Lopes (1890-2005) Portuguese supercentenarian
Fernão Lopes (c.1380–1459), Portuguese royal chronicler
Fernão Lopes (died 1545), Portuguese sailor and first inhabitant of the island of Saint Helena
Gregório Lopes (c.1490–1550), Portuguese painter
Cristóvão Lopes (c.1516–1594), Portuguese painter
Sir Manasseh Masseh Lopes, 1st Baronet (1755–1831), British Member of Parliament
Sir Ralph Lopes, 2nd Baronet (born "Ralph Franco" 1788–1854), British Member of Parliament
Sir Massey Lopes, 3rd Baronet (born "Massey Franco" 1818–1908), British Member of Parliament
Henry Lopes, 1st Baron Roborough (1859–1938), British Member of Parliament
Francisco Craveiro Lopes (1894–1960), Portuguese politician and military
Joao Abel Pecas Lopes, Portuguese engineer
Laura Lopes (born 1978), daughter of Camilla, Duchess of Cornwall and Andrew Parker Bowles, OBE
Manuel Lopes (barber) (before 1850–after 1870), United States barber and first Black resident of Seattle
Nei Lopes (born 1942), Brazilian musician
Manuel Lopes (1907–2005), Capeverdian writer
Martinho da Costa Lopes (1918–1991), East Timorese religious and political leader
Massey Lopes, 2nd Baron Roborough (1903–1992),  British peer and officer of the British Army
Américo Lopes (born 1933), Portuguese footballer
Fernando Lopes (born 1935), Portuguese filmmaker
Carlos Lopes (born 1947), Portuguese long-distance athlete
Demetrius Klee Lopes (born 1970), Brazilian-American cerebrovascular neurosurgeon
Davey Lopes (born 1945), United States baseball player and manager
Luís Carlos Melo Lopes (born 1954), Brazilian footballer
Rosaly Lopes (born 1957), Brazilian earth-scientist
Giulio Lopes (born 1959), Brazilian actor
Marcelo Gonçalves Costa Lopes (born 1966), Brazilian footballer
Júlio Lópes (born 1967), Brazilian swimmer
Wagner Lopes (born 1969); Japanese footballer
Alexandre Paes Lopes (born 1974), Brazilian footballer
Daniel Lopes (born 1976), German singer
Welington Nogueira Lopes (born 1979), Brazilian footballer
Ana Paula Lopes (born 1979), Brazilian singer
Carlos Eduardo Lopes (born 1980), Brazilian footballer
Patrick Fabíonn Lopes (born 1980), Brazilian footballer
Astolpho Junio Lopes (born 1983), Brazilian
Leandro Lopes (born 1984), Brazilian
Matheus Henrique do Carmo Lopes (born 1985), Brazilian
Felipe Aliste Lopes (born 1987), Brazilian
Ernando Rodrigues Lopes (born 1988), Brazilian
Everton Lopes (born 1988), Brazilian
Mateus Lopes (born 1972), Capeverdian
Aniceto Guterres Lopes (born 1967), East Timorese
Osvaldo Lopes (born 1980), French
Adelino Lopes (born 1976), Guinea-Bissaun
Sufrim Lopes (born 1981), Guinea-Bissaun
Cecilio Lopes (born 1979), Dutch
António Bastos Lopes (born 1953), Portuguese
Pedro Santana Lopes (born 1956), Portuguese
Fátima Lopes (born 1965), Portuguese
Tiago André Coelho Lopes (born 1989), Portuguese
Lisa Lopes (1971–2002), United States
Brian Lopes (born 1971), United States
Danny Lopes (born 1982), United States
Mécia Lopes de Haro (died 1270), Portuguese
Henrique Lopes de Mendonça (1856–1931), Portuguese
João Simões Lopes Neto (1865–1916), Brazilian
Baltasar Lopes da Silva (1907–1989), Capeverdian
Álvaro Lopes Cançado (1912–1984), Brazilian
Antônio Lopes (born 1941), Brazilian
Dirceu Lopes (born 1946), Brazilian
Amílcar Lopes Cabral (1924–1973), Capeverdian and Guinea-Bissau Statesman.
António Lopes Ribeiro (1908–1995), Portuguese
Paulo José Lopes de Figueiredo (born 1972),  Angolan
Steven J. Lopes (born 1975), Portuguese American Roman Catholic Bishop of the Personal Ordinariate of the Chair of Saint Peter
Tim Lopes (1950–2002), Brazilian
Roberto Lopes (born 1966), Brazilian
Rinaldo Lopes Costa (born 1968), Brazilian
Luciano Lopes de Souza (born 1974), Brazilian
Marcelo Lopes de Faria (born 1976), Brazilian
Fábio Lopes Alcântara (born 1977), Brazilian
Fábio Deivison Lopes Maciel (born 1980), Brazilian
Wesley Lopes da Silva (born 1980), Brazilian
Almir Lopes de Luna (born 1982), Brazilian
Carlos Michel Lopes Vargas (born 1982), Brazilian
Roberto Lopes Nascimento (born 1983), Brazilian
Leila Lopes (born 1986), Angolan Miss Universe 2011 winner.
Wesley Lopes Beltrame (born 1987), Brazilian
Neylor Lopes Gonçalves (born 1987), Brazilian
Christian Lopes (born 1992), American
Santinho Lopes Monteiro (born 1979), Dutch
Valmiro Lopes Rocha (born 1981), Spanish
Fernando Lopes-Graça (1906–1994), Portuguese
Olga Lopes-Seale (born 1918), Barbadian
Ephraim Lópes Pereira d'Aguilar, 2nd Baron d'Aguilar (1709–1832), British
John Reginald Lopes Yarde-Buller, 3rd Baron Churston (1873–1930), British
Oscar Lino Lopes Fernandes Braga (born 1931), Angolan
Lopes Gonçalves, Portuguese explorer
Elvira Tânia Lopes Martins (born 1957), Brazilian

Galician-language surnames
Portuguese-language surnames
Patronymic surnames